Masters of Cinema is a line of DVD and Blu-ray releases published through Eureka Entertainment. Because of the uniformly branded and spine-numbered packaging and the standard inclusion of booklets and analysis by recurring film historians, the line is often perceived as the UK equivalent of The Criterion Collection.

History 
The line takes its name from a film website by the same name that was launched in 2001 and covered the work of well-regarded film directors such as Andrei Tarkovsky, Akira Kurosawa, Carl Theodor Dreyer and Yasujirō Ozu. In 2004, the website began coordinating with Eureka Entertainment to offer a line of DVDs that focused on renowned filmmakers and films considered to be the best of their type. In 2008, the organization was sold to Eureka Entertainment and became a wholly owned label of the company.

Collaborations 
In their effort to create definitive editions the line complements their releases with a collection of new or available scholarly material such as interviews, documentaries, essays, and commentary tracks. Filmmakers such as Guillermo del Toro, Martin Scorsese, Peter Watkins and Claude Lanzmann, scholars such as Tony Rayns, David Bordwell and David Kalat and critics such as Kent Jones, Phillip Lopate, Adrian Martin and Jonathan Rosenbaum have all created exclusive content that was used for releases in the line.

Releases 
Masters of Cinema started releasing titles on DVD in 2004. In 2008, the company expanded the range to include Blu-ray and Dual Format releases. As of 2017, the company has released over 250 films under the line, including more than 160 films on Blu-ray.

DVD 
The following is a list of films released or announced for future release by Masters of Cinema on DVD.

{| class="wikitable"
! width="550" colspan="2" | Legend
|-
| width="35" style="background:Grey" align="center" | 
| A DVD release currently out of print
|}

Blu-ray Disc 
The following is a list of films released or announced for future release by Masters of Cinema on Blu-ray Disc.

{| class="wikitable"
! width="550" colspan="2" | Legend
|-
| width="35" style="background:Grey" align="center" | 
| A Blu-ray release currently out of print
|-
| colspan="2" | 
|-
| colspan="2" | The "SteelBook" column denotes the availability of a release with a SteelBook case
|-
| colspan="2" | The "Dual Format" column denotes the availability of a release with both the Blu-ray Disc and a DVD
|}

{| class="wikitable sortable"
! #
! Title
! Director
! Year
! Release Date
! DVD #
! SteelBook
! Dual Format
! Notes
|-
| align="left" | 001
| align="left" | Sunrise: A Song of Two Humans
| align="left" | 
| align="left" | 1927
| align="left" | 
| align="left" | 001
|
| 
| align="left" | 
|-
| style="background:Grey" align="left" | 002
| align="left" | Mad Detective
| align="left" | 
| align="left" | 2007
| align="left" | 
| align="left" | 071
|
| 
| align="left" | 
|-
| style="background:Grey" align="left" | 003
| align="left" | Tokyo Sonata
| align="left" | 
| align="left" | 2008
| align="left" | 
| align="left" | 081
|
| 
| align="left" | 
|-
| style="background:Grey" align="left" | 004
| align="left" | 
| align="left" | 
| align="left" | 1964
| align="left" | 
| align="left" | 080
|
| 
| align="left" | 
|-
| style="background:Grey" align="left" | 005
| align="left" | For All Mankind
| align="left" | 
| align="left" | 1989
| align="left" | 
| align="left" | 088
|
| 
| align="left" | 
|-
| align="left" | 006
| align="left" |  (a.k.a. Fantastic Planet)
| align="left" | 
| align="left" | 1973
| align="left" | 
| align="left" | 034
|
| 
| align="left" | 
|-
| style="background:Grey" align="left" | 007
| align="left" | Soul Power
| align="left" | 
| align="left" | 2009
| align="left" | 
| align="left" | 087
|
| 
| align="left" | 
|-
| align="left" | 008
| align="left" | City Girl
| align="left" | 
| align="left" | 1930
| align="left" | 
| align="left" | 101
|
| 
| align="left" | 
|-
| align="left" | 009
| align="left" | M
| align="left" | 
| align="left" | 1931
| align="left" | 
| align="left" | 092
|
| 
| align="left" | 
|-
| style="background:Grey" align="left" | 010
| align="left" | Profound Desires of the Gods
| align="left" | 
| align="left" | 1968
| align="left" | 
| align="left" | 102
|
| 
| align="left" | Also part of the Shohei Imamura box-set (Limited Dual Format Edition of 1500 copies)
|-
| style="background:Grey" align="left" | 011
| align="left" | Vengeance Is Mine
| align="left" | 
| align="left" | 1979
| align="left" | 
| align="left" | 017
|
| 
| align="left" | Also part of the Shohei Imamura box-set (Limited Dual Format Edition of 1500 copies)

|-
| style="background:Grey" align="left" | 012
| align="left" | 
| align="left" | Jia Zhangke
| align="left" | 2004
| align="left" | 
| align="left" | 
|
| 
| align="left" | 
|-
| style="background:Grey" align="left" | 013
| align="left" | 
| align="left" | 
| align="left" | 1956
| align="left" | 
| align="left" | 103
|
| 
| align="left" | 
|-
| style="background:Grey" align="left" | 014
| align="left" | Will Success Spoil Rock Hunter?
| align="left" | 
| align="left" | 1957
| align="left" | 
| align="left" | 104
|
| 
| align="left" | 
|-
| style="background:Grey" align="left" | 015
| align="left" | Make Way for Tomorrow
| align="left" | 
| align="left" | 1937
| align="left" | 
| align="left" | 105
|
| 
| align="left" | 
|-
| align="left" | 016
| align="left" | Metropolis
| align="left" | 
| align="left" | 1927
| align="left" | 
| align="left" | 008
| 
| 
| align="left" | 'Metropolis: 90th Anniversary' hard case set (Limited Dual Format Edition 2000 copies) was released on 9 October 2017
|-
| style="background:Grey" align="left" | 017
| align="left" | 
| align="left" | 
| align="left" | 1953
| align="left" | 
| align="left" | 
|
| 
| align="left" | 
|-
| style="background:Grey" align="left" | 018
| align="left" | 
| align="left" | 
| align="left" | 1955
| align="left" | 
| align="left" | 
|
| 
| align="left" | 
|-
| style="background:Grey" align="left" | 019
| align="left" | Cœur fidèle
| align="left" | 
| align="left" | 1923
| align="left" | 
| align="left" | 
|
| 
| align="left" | 
|-
| align="left" | 020
| align="left" | Harakiri (a.k.a. Seppuku)
| align="left" | 
| align="left" | 1962
| align="left" | 
| align="left" | 
|
| 
| align="left" | 
|-
| style="background:Grey" align="left" | 021
| align="left" | Pigs and Battleships
| align="left" | 
| align="left" | 1961
| align="left" | 
| align="left" | 
|
| 
| align="left" | Also includes Stolen Desire (1958). Also part of the Shohei Imamura box-set (Limited Dual Format Edition of 1500 copies)
|-
| style="background:Grey" align="left" | 022
| align="left" | 
| align="left" | 
| align="left" | 1963
| align="left" | 
| align="left" | 
|
| 
| align="left" | Also includes Nishi Ginza Station (1958). Also part of the Shohei Imamura box-set (Limited Dual Format Edition of 1500 copies)
|-
| style="background:Grey" align="left" | 023
| align="left" | Silent Running
| align="left" | 
| align="left" | 1972
| align="left" | 
| align="left" | 
| 
| 
| align="left" | 
|-
| style="background:Grey" align="left" | 024
| align="left" | 
| align="left" | 
| align="left" | 1983
| align="left" | 
| align="left" | 
|
| 
| align="left" | Also part of the Shohei Imamura box-set (Limited Dual Format Edition of 1500 copies)

|-
| align="left" | 025
| align="left" | Touch of Evil
| align="left" | 
| align="left" | 1958
| align="left" | 
| align="left" | 
| 
| 
| align="left" | 
|-
| align="left" | 026
| align="left" | Two-Lane Blacktop
| align="left" | 
| align="left" | 1971
| align="left" | 
| align="left" | 
| 
| 
| align="left" | 
|-
| align="left" | 027
| align="left" | Repo Man
| align="left" | 
| align="left" | 1984
| align="left" | 
| align="left" | 
| 
| 
| align="left" | 
|-
| style="background:Grey" align="left" | 028
| align="left" | 
| align="left" | 
| align="left" | 1949
| align="left" | 
| align="left" | 046
|
| 
| align="left" | 
|-
| style="background:Grey" align="left" | 029
| align="left" | Punishment Park
| align="left" | 
| align="left" | 1971
| align="left" | 
| align="left" | 021
|
| 
| align="left" | 
|-
| style="background:Grey" align="left" | 030
| align="left" | Lifeboat
| align="left" | 
| align="left" | 1944
| align="left" | 
| align="left" | 
| 
| 
| align="left" | Also includes Bon voyage (1944) and Aventure malgache (1944)
|-
| align="left" | 031
| align="left" | Accattone
| align="left" | 
| align="left" | 1961
| align="left" | 
| align="left" | 
|
| 
| align="left" | Also includes Comizi d'amore (1964)
|-
| align="left" | 032
| align="left" | Island of Lost Souls
| align="left" | 
| align="left" | 1932
| align="left" | 
| align="left" | 
| 
| 
| align="left" | 
|-
| align="left" | 033
| align="left" | 
| align="left" | 
| align="left" | 1964
| align="left" | 
| align="left" | 
|
| 
| align="left" | Also includes Sopralluoghi in Palestina (1965)
|-
| style="background:Grey" | 034
| Cleopatra
| 
| 
| 
| 114
| 
| 
|
|-
| style="background:Grey" align="left" | 035
| align="left" | Ruggles of Red Gap
| align="left" | 
| align="left" | 1935
| align="left" | 
| align="left" | 
|
| 
| align="left" | 
|-
| style="background:Grey" align="left" | 036
| align="left" | Ugetsu Monogatari
| align="left" | 
| align="left" | 1953
| align="left" | 
| align="left" | 052 053
|
| 
| align="left" | Also includes Oyū-sama (1951)Part of Late Mizoguchi: Eight Films, 1951–1956 box set
|-
| style="background:Grey" align="left" | 037
| align="left" | Sansho Dayu
| align="left" | 
| align="left" | 1954
| align="left" | 
| align="left" | 054 055
|
| 
| align="left" | Also includes Gion Bayashi (1953)Part of Late Mizoguchi: Eight Films, 1951–1956 box set
|-
| style="background:Grey" align="left" | 038
| align="left" | Ro.Go.Pa.G.
| align="left" | 
| align="left" | 1963
| align="left" | 
| align="left" | 115
|
| 
| align="left" | 
|-
| align="left" | 039
| align="left" | Oedipus Rex
| align="left" | 
| align="left" | 1967
| align="left" | 
| align="left" | 116
|
| 
| align="left" | 
|-
| align="left" | 040
| align="left" | Gate of Hell
| align="left" | 
| align="left" | 1953
| align="left" | 
| align="left" | 117
|
| 
| align="left" | 
|-
| style="background:Grey" align="left" | 041
| align="left" | Floating Weeds
| align="left" | 
| align="left" | 1959
| align="left" | 
| align="left" | 118
|
| 
| align="left" | 
|-
| align="left" | 042
| align="left" | Rumble Fish
| align="left" | 
| align="left" | 1983
| align="left" | 
| align="left" | 
| 
| 
| align="left" | 
|-
| align="left" | 043
| align="left" | Das Testament des Dr. Mabuse
| align="left" | 
| align="left" | 1933
| align="left" | 
| align="left" | 090
| 
| 
| align="left" | 
|-
| align="left" | 044
| align="left" | Double Indemnity
| align="left" | 
| align="left" | 1944
| align="left" | 
| align="left" | 
| 
| 
| align="left" | 
|-
| align="left" | 045
| align="left" | 
| align="left" | 
| align="left" | 1945
| align="left" | 
| align="left" | 
| 
| 
| align="left" | 
|-
| align="left" | 046
| align="left" | 
| align="left" | 
| align="left" | 1924
| align="left" | 
| align="left" | 120
|
| 
| align="left" | 
|-
| align="left" | 047
| align="left" | 
| align="left" | 
| align="left" | 1961
| align="left" | 
| align="left" | 061
|
| 
| align="left" | 
|-
| style="background:Grey" align="left" | 048
| align="left" | 
| align="left" | 
| align="left" | 1951
| align="left" | 
| align="left" | 123
|
| 
| align="left" | 
|-
| align="left" | 049
| align="left" | 
| 
| align="left" | 1930
| align="left" | 
| align="left" | 
|
| 
| align="left" | 
|-
| align="left" | 050
| align="left" | 
| align="left" | 
| align="left" | 1928
| align="left" | 
| align="left" | 125
| 
| 
| align="left" | 
|-
| style="background:Grey" align="left" | 051
| align="left" | Fear and Desire
| align="left" | 
| align="left" | 1953
| align="left" | 
| align="left" | 126
|
| 
| align="left" | 
|-
| style="background:Grey" align="left" | 052
| align="left" | 
| align="left" | 
| align="left" | 1915
| align="left" | 
| align="left" | 127
|
| 
| align="left" | 
|-
| style="background:Grey" align="left" | 053
| align="left" | 
| align="left" | 
| align="left" | 1980
| align="left" | 
| align="left" | 128
|
| 
| align="left" | 
|-
| style="background:Grey" align="left" | 054
| align="left" | 
| align="left" | 
| align="left" | 1960
| align="left" | 
| align="left" | 012
|
| 
| align="left" | 
|-
| align="left" | 055
| align="left" | Onibaba
| align="left" | 
| align="left" | 1964
| align="left" | 
| align="left" | 013
|
| 
| align="left" | 
|-
| align="left" | 056
| align="left" | Kuroneko
| align="left" | 
| align="left" | 1968
| align="left" | 
| align="left" | 014
|
| 
| align="left" | 
|-
| style="background:Grey" align="left" | 057
| align="left" | 
| align="left" | 
| align="left" | 1942
| align="left" | 
| align="left" | 124
|
| 
| align="left" | 
|-
| style="background:Grey" align="left" | 058
| align="left" | 
| align="left" | 
| align="left" | 1958
| align="left" | 
| align="left" | 129
|
| 
| align="left" | 
|-
| style="background:Grey" align="left" | 059
| align="left" | 
| align="left" | 
| align="left" | 1959
| align="left" | 
| align="left" | 130
|
| 
| align="left" | 
|-
| style="background:Grey" align="left" | 060
| align="left" | Bakumatsu Taiyo-den
| align="left" | 
| align="left" | 1957
| align="left" | 
| align="left" | 131
|
| 
| align="left" | 
|-
| align="left" | 061
| align="left" | Tabu: A Story of the South Seas
| align="left" | 
| align="left" | 1931
| align="left" | 
| align="left" | 066
|
| 
| align="left" | 
|-
| style="background:Grey" align="left" | 062
| align="left" | 
| align="left" | 
| align="left" | 1981
| align="left" | 
| align="left" | 132
|
| 
| align="left" | 
|-
| style="background:Grey" align="left" | 063
| align="left" | Simon Killer
| align="left" | 
| align="left" | 2012
| align="left" | 
| align="left" | 133
|
| 
| align="left" | 
|-
| style="background:Grey" align="left" | 064
| align="left" | 
| align="left" | 
| align="left" | 1957
| align="left" | 
| align="left" | 
|
| 
| align="left" | 
|-
| style="background:Grey" align="left" | 065
| align="left" | 
| align="left" | 
| align="left" | 1957
| align="left" | 
| align="left" | 065
|
| 
| align="left" | 
|-
| style="background:Grey" align="left" | 066
| align="left" | 
| align="left" | 
| align="left" | 1955
| align="left" | 
| align="left" | 
|
| 
| align="left" | 
|-
| style="background:Grey" align="left" | 067
| align="left" | Van Gogh
| align="left" | 
| align="left" | 1991
| align="left" | 
| align="left" | 135
|
| 
| align="left" | 
|-
| style="background:Grey" align="left" | 068
| align="left" | Red River
| align="left" | 
| align="left" | 1948
| align="left" | 
| align="left" | 
|
| 
| align="left" | 
|-
| align="left" | 069
| align="left" | Dr. Mabuse der Spieler
| align="left" | 
| align="left" | 1922
| align="left" | 
| align="left" | 089
| 
| 
| align="left" | 
|-
| align="left" | 070
| align="left" | Nosferatu
| align="left" | 
| align="left" | 1922
| align="left" | 
| align="left" | 064
| 
| 
| align="left" | 
|-
| style="background:Grey" align="left" | 071
| align="left" | Chikamatsu Monogatari
| align="left" | 
| align="left" | 1954
| align="left" | 
| align="left" | 056 057
|
| 
| align="left" | Also includes Uwasa no onna (1954)Part of Late Mizoguchi: Eight Films, 1951–1956 box set
|-
| style="background:Grey" align="left" | 072
| align="left" | Akasen Chitai
| align="left" | 
| align="left" | 1956
| align="left" | 
| align="left" | 058 059
|
| 
| align="left" | Also includes Yokihi (1955)Part of Late Mizoguchi: Eight Films, 1951–1956 box set
|-
| style="background:Grey" align="left" | 073
| align="left" | Dry Summer
| align="left" | 
| align="left" | 1964
| align="left" | 
| align="left" | 
|
| 
| align="left" | Part of Martin Scorsese Presents World Cinema Foundation Volume One box set
|-
| style="background:Grey" align="left" | 074
| align="left" | Trances
| align="left" | 
| align="left" | 1981
| align="left" | 
| align="left" | 
|
| 
| align="left" | Part of Martin Scorsese Presents World Cinema Foundation Volume One box set
|-
| style="background:Grey" align="left" | 075
| align="left" | Revenge
| align="left" | 
| align="left" | 1989
| align="left" | 
| align="left" | 
|
| 
| align="left" | Part of Martin Scorsese Presents World Cinema Foundation Volume One box set
|-
| style="background:Grey" align="left" | 076
| align="left" | Computer Chess
| align="left" | 
| align="left" | 2013
| align="left" | 
| align="left" | 
|
| 
| align="left" | 
|-
| align="left" | 077
| align="left" | Wings
| align="left" | 
| align="left" | 1927
| align="left" | 
| align="left" | 
|
| 
| align="left" | 
|-
| align="left" | 078
| align="left" | Faust
| align="left" | 
| align="left" | 1926
| align="left" | 
| align="left" | 024
|
| 
| align="left" | 
|-
| align="left" | 079
| align="left" | Serpico
| align="left" | 
| align="left" | 1973
| align="left" | 
| align="left" | 
| 
| 
| align="left" | 
|-
| style="background:Grey" align="left" | 080
| align="left" | Nashville
| align="left" | 
| align="left" | 1975
| align="left" | 
| align="left" | 
|
| 
| align="left" | 
|-
| align="left" | 081
| align="left" | White Dog
| align="left" | 
| align="left" | 1982
| align="left" | 
| align="left" | 
|
| 
| align="left" | 
|-
| align="left" | 082
| align="left" | Ace in the Hole
| align="left" | 
| align="left" | 1951
| align="left" | 
| align="left" | 
|
| 
| align="left" | 
|-
| style="background:Grey" align="left" | 083
| align="left" | Harold and Maude
| align="left" | 
| align="left" | 1971
| align="left" | 
| align="left" | 
|
| 
| align="left" | 
|-
| align="left" | 084
| align="left" | If....
| align="left" | 
| align="left" | 1968
| align="left" | 
| align="left" | 
|
| 
| align="left" | 
|-
| style="background:Grey" align="left" | 085
| align="left" | Too Late Blues
| align="left" | 
| align="left" | 1962
| align="left" | 
| align="left" | 
|
| 
| align="left" | 
|-
| style="background:Grey" align="left" | 086
| align="left" | Roma
| align="left" | 
| align="left" | 1972
| align="left" | 
| align="left" | 
|
| 
| align="left" | 
|-
| style="background:Grey" align="left" | 087
| align="left" | Hands over the City
| align="left" | 
| align="left" | 1963
| align="left" | 
| align="left" | 
|
| 
| align="left" | 
|-
| align="left" | 088
| align="left" | Wake in Fright
| align="left" | 
| align="left" | 1971
| align="left" | 
| align="left" | 
|
| 
| align="left" | 
|-
| style="background:Grey" align="left" | 089
| align="left" | Boomerang!
| align="left" | 
| align="left" | 1947
| align="left" | 
| align="left" | 
|
| 
| align="left" | Also includes Elia Kazan Outsider (1982)
|-
| align="left" | 090
| align="left" | Spione
| align="left" | 
| align="left" | 1928
| align="left" | 
| align="left" | 009
|
| 
| align="left" | 
|-
| align="left" | 091
| align="left" | Frau im Mond
| align="left" | 
| align="left" | 1929
| align="left" | 
| align="left" | 041
|
| 
| align="left" | 
|-
| align="left" | 092
| align="left" | The Cabinet of Dr. Caligari
| align="left" | 
| align="left" | 1920
| align="left" | 
| align="left" | 
| 
| 
| align="left" | Limited Edition Ultra HD Blu-Ray Boxset released on 5th December, 2022 (3000 copies only)
|-
| align="left" | 093
| align="left" | Madame Dubarry
| align="left" | 
| align="left" | 1919
| align="left" | 
| align="left" | 
|
| 
| align="left" | Also includes Als ich tot war (1916)
|-
| style="background:Grey" align="left" | 094
| align="left" | The Gang's All Here
| align="left" | 
| align="left" | 1943
| align="left" | 
| align="left" | 
|
| 
| align="left" | 
|-
| style="background:Grey" align="left" | 095
| align="left" | I clowns
| align="left" | 
| align="left" | 1970
| align="left" | 
| align="left" | 
|
| 
| align="left" | 
|-
| style="background:Grey" align="left" | 096
| align="left" | Youth of the Beast
| align="left" | 
| align="left" | 1963
| align="left" | 
| align="left" | 
|
| 
| align="left" | 
|-
| align="left" | 097
| align="left" | Diary of a Lost Girl
| align="left" | 
| align="left" | 1929
| align="left" | 
| align="left" | 039
|
| 
| align="left" | 
|-
| align="left" | 098
| align="left" | The Thief of Bagdad: An Arabian Nights Fantasy
| align="left" | 
| align="left" | 1924
| align="left" | 
| align="left" | 
|
| 
| align="left" | 
|-
| align="left" | 099
| align="left" | Intolerance: Love's Struggle Throughout the Ages
| align="left" | 
| align="left" | 1916
| align="left" | 
| align="left" | 
|
| 
| align="left" | 
|-
| align="left" | 100
| align="left" | Shoah
| align="left" | 
| align="left" | 1985
| align="left" | 
| align="left" | 038
|
| 
| align="left" | Part of Shoah and Four Films After Shoah box set
|-
| align="left" | 101
| align="left" | A Visitor from the Living
| align="left" | 
| align="left" | 1999
| align="left" | 
| align="left" | 136
|
| 
| align="left" | Part of Shoah and Four Films After Shoah box set
|-
| align="left" | 102
| align="left" | Sobibor, Oct. 14, 1943, 4 p.m
| align="left" | 
| align="left" | 2001
| align="left" | 
| align="left" | 137
|
| 
| align="left" | Part of Shoah and Four Films After Shoah box set
|-
| align="left" | 103
| align="left" | The Karski Report
| align="left" | 
| align="left" | 2010
| align="left" | 
| align="left" | 138
|
| 
| align="left" | Part of Shoah and Four Films After Shoah box set
|-
| align="left" | 104
| align="left" | The Last of the Unjust
| align="left" | 
| align="left" | 2013
| align="left" | 
| align="left" | 139
|
| 
| align="left" | Part of Shoah and Four Films After Shoah box set
|-
| style="background:Grey" align="left" | 105
| align="left" | Wooden Crosses
| align="left" | 
| align="left" | 1932
| align="left" | 
| align="left" | 
|
| 
| align="left" | 
|-
| style="background:Grey" align="left" | 106
| align="left" | Les misérables
| align="left" | 
| align="left" | 1934
| align="left" | 
| align="left" | 134
|
| 
| align="left" | 
|-
| style="background:Grey" align="left" | 107
| align="left" | Two for the Road
| align="left" | 
| align="left" | 1967
| align="left" | 
| align="left" | 
|
| 
| align="left" | 
|-
| style="background:Grey" align="left" | 108
| align="left" | Wild River
| align="left" | 
| align="left" | 1960
| align="left" | 
| align="left" | 
|
| 
| align="left" | 
|-
| style="background:Grey" align="left" | 109
| align="left" | Man of the West
| align="left" | 
| align="left" | 1958
| align="left" | 
| align="left" | 
|
| 
| align="left" | 
|-
| align="left" | 110
| align="left" | The Offence
| align="left" | 
| align="left" | 1973
| align="left" | 
| align="left" | 
|
| 
| align="left" | 
|-
| align="left" | 111
| align="left" | Pickup on South Street
| align="left" | 
| align="left" | 1953
| align="left" | 
| align="left" | 
|
| 
| align="left" | 
|-
| style="background:Grey" align="left" | 112
| align="left" | Fellini Satyricon
| align="left" | 
| align="left" | 1969
| align="left" | 
| align="left" | 
|
| 
| align="left" | 
|-
| align="left" | 113
| align="left" | Paper Moon
| align="left" | 
| align="left" | 1973
| align="left" | 
| align="left" | 
|
| 
| align="left" | 
|-
| style="background:Grey" align="left" | 114
| align="left" | A Letter to Three Wives
| align="left" | 
| align="left" | 1949
| align="left" | 
| align="left" | 
|
| 
| align="left" | 
|-
| style="background:Grey" align="left" | 115
| align="left" | Life of Riley
| align="left" | 
| align="left" | 2014
| align="left" | 
| align="left" | 
|
| 
| align="left" | 
|-
| style="background:Grey" align="left" | 116
| align="left" | Forty Guns
| align="left" | 
| align="left" | 1957
| align="left" | 
| align="left" | 
|
| 
| align="left" | 
|-
| align="left" | 117
| align="left" | Stalag 17
| align="left" | 
| align="left" | 1953
| align="left" | 
| align="left" | 
|
| 
| align="left" | 
|-
| style="background:Grey" align="left" | 118
| align="left" | Cruel Story of Youth
| align="left" | 
| align="left" | 1960
| align="left" | 
| align="left" | 
|
| 
| align="left" | 
|-
| style="background:Grey" align="left" | 119
| align="left" | Listen Up Philip
| align="left" | 
| align="left" | 2014
| align="left" | 
| align="left" | 
|
| 
| align="left" | 
|-
| align="left" style="background:Grey" | 120
| align="left" | Medium Cool
| align="left" | 
| align="left" | 1969
| align="left" | 
| align="left" | 
|
| 
| align="left" | 
|-
| align="left" | 121
| align="left" | The Friends of Eddie Coyle
| align="left" | 
| align="left" | 1973
| align="left" | 
| align="left" | 
|
| 
| align="left" | 
|-
| align="left" | 122
| align="left" | Seconds
| align="left" | 
| align="left" | 1966
| align="left" | 
| align="left" | 
|
| 
| align="left" | 
|-
| align="left" | 123
| align="left" | Shane
| align="left" | 
| align="left" | 1953
| align="left" | 
| align="left" | 
|
| 
| align="left" | Limited Edition 2 x Blu-ray (first print run of 2000 copies only)
Non-limited edition released 6 June 2016
|-
| align="left" | 124
| align="left" | Day of the Outlaw
| align="left" | 
| align="left" | 1959
| align="left" | 
| align="left" | 
|
| 
| align="left" | 
|-
| align="left" | 125
| align="left" | The Quiet Man
| align="left" | 
| align="left" | 1952
| align="left" | 
| align="left" | 
|
| 
| align="left" | 
|-
| align="left" style="background:Grey" | 126
| align="left" | The Naked Prey
| align="left" | 
| align="left" | 1965
| align="left" | 
| align="left" | 
|
| 
| align="left" | 
|-
| style="background:Grey" align="left" | 127
| align="left" | Fixed Bayonets!
| align="left" | 
| align="left" | 1951
| align="left" | 
| align="left" | 
|
| 
| align="left" | 
|-
| align="left" | 128
| align="left" | Three Days of the Condor
| align="left" | 
| align="left" | 1975
| align="left" | 
| align="left" | 
|
| 
| align="left" | 
|-
| align="left" | 129
| align="left" | Dragon Inn
| align="left" | 
| align="left" | 1967
| align="left" | 
| align="left" | 
|
| 
| align="left" | 
|-
| align="left" | 130
| align="left" | A Touch of Zen
| align="left" | 
| align="left" | 1971
| align="left" | 
| align="left" | 
|
| 
| align="left" | Limited 3-disc O-card edition (first print run of 2000 copies only)
|-
| style="background:Grey" align="left" | 131
| align="left" | A New Leaf
| align="left" | 
| align="left" | 1971
| align="left" | 
| align="left" | 
|
| 
| align="left" | 
|-
| style="background:Grey" align="left" | 132
| align="left" | Eureka
| align="left" | 
| align="left" | 1983
| align="left" | 
| align="left" | 
|
| 
| align="left" | 
|-
| align="left" | 133
| align="left" | Rocco and His Brothers
| align="left" | 
| align="left" | 1960
| align="left" | 
| align="left" | 048
|
| 
| align="left" | 
|-
| 134
| Man with a Movie Camera
| 
| 1929
| 
|
|
| 
| Also includes Kino-Eye (1924), Kino-Pravda (1925), Enthusiasm: Symphony of the Donbass (1931) and Three Songs About Lenin (1934)
|-
| 135
| Novecento
| 
| 1976
| 
|
|
| 
|
|-
| style="background:Grey" | 136
| Uccellacci e uccellini
| 
| 1966
| 
| 109
|
| 
| Released in Double feature with Porcile
|-
| style="background:Grey" | 137
| Porcile
| 
| 1969
| 
| 110
|
| 
| Released in Double feature with Uccellacci e uccellini
|-
| 138
| Journey to the Shore
| 
| 2015
| 
|
|
| 
|
|-
| style="background:Grey" | 139
| Edvard Munch
| 
| 1974
| 
| 051
|
| 
|
|-
| 140
| Schloss Vogelöd (a.k.a. The Haunted Castle)
| 
| 1921
| 
| 108
|
| 
| Part of Early Murnau – Five Films, 1921–1925 box set
|-
| 141
| Phantom
| 
| 1922
| 
| 084
|
| 
| Part of Early Murnau – Five Films, 1921–1925 box set
|-
| 142
| Der letzte Mann (a.k.a. The Last Laugh)
| 
| 1924
| 
| 023
|
| 
| Part of Early Murnau – Five Films, 1921–1925 box set
|-
| 143
| Die Finanzen des Großherzogs
| 
| 1924
| 
| 085
|
| 
| Part of Early Murnau – Five Films, 1921–1925 box set
|-
| 144
| Tartuffe (a.k.a. Herr Tartüff)
| 
| 1926
| 
| 004
|
| 
| Part of Early Murnau – Five Films, 1921–1925 box set
|-
| 145
| That Cold Day in the Park
| 
| 1969
| 
|
|
| 
|
|-
| 146
| The Last Command
| 
| 1928
| 
|
|
| 
|
|-
| 147
| Fedora
| 
| 1975
| 
|
|
| 
|
|-
| style="background:Grey" | 148
| Conversation Piece
| 
| 1974
| 
|
|
| 
|
|-
| style="background:Grey" | 149
| The Flight of the Phoenix
| 
| 1965
| 
|
|
| 
|
|-
| 150
| The Complete Buster Keaton Short Films 1917–1923
| , Edward F. Cline, Buster Keaton, Malcolm St. Clair
| 1917–1923
| 
| 30
|
| 
| Includes The Butcher Boy, The Rough House, His Wedding Night, Oh Doctor!, Coney Island, Out West, The Bell Boy, Moonshine, Good Night, Nurse!, The Cook, Back Stage, The Hayseed, The Garage, The High Sign, One Week, Convict 13, The Scarecrow, Neighbors, The Haunted House, Hard Luck, The Goat, The Playhouse, The Boat, The Paleface, Cops, My Wife's Relations, The Blacksmith, The Frozen North, Daydreams, The Electric House, The Balloonatic, The Love Nest
|-
| 151
| Kes
| 
| 1969
| 
|
|
| 
|
|-
| 152
| Twilight's Last Gleaming
| 
| 1977
| 
|
|
| 
|
|-
| 153
| Sweet Bean
| 
| 2015
| 
|
|
| 
|
|-
| style="background:Grey" | 154
| Queen of Earth
| 
| 2015
| 
|
|
| 
|
|-
| 155
| Paths of Glory
| 
| 1957
| 
|
|
| 
|
|-
| 156
| The Man from Laramie
| 
| 1955
| 
|
|
| 
|
|-
| 157
| Hard Times
| 
| 1975
| 
|
|
| 
|
|-
| 158
| Two Rode Together
| 
| 1961
| 
|
|
| 
|
|-
| 159
| Creepy
| 
| 2016
| 
|
|
| 
|
|-
| style="background:Grey" | 160
| Variety
| 
| 1925
| 
|
|
| 
|
|-
| 161
| Der müde Tod
| 
| 1921
| 
|
|
| 
|
|-
| style="background:Grey" | 162
| Cover Girl
| 
| 1944
| 
|
|
| 
|
|-
| 163
| A Man for All Seasons
| 
| 1966
| 
|
|
| 
|
|-
| 164
| Harmonium
| 
| 2016
| 
|
|
| 
|-
| 165
| Daughter of the Nile
| 
| 1987
| 
|
|
| 
|-
| 166
| Drunken Master
| Yuen Woo-ping
| 1978
| 
|
|
| 
|
|-
| style="background:Grey" | 167
| Death in the Garden
| 
| 1956
| 
|
|
| 
|
|-
| 168
| The Saga of Anatahan
| 
| 1953
| 
|
|
| 
|
|-
| style="background:Grey" |  169
| The Mourning Forest
| 
| 2007
| 
|
|
| 
|
|-
| 170
| Westfront 1918
| 
| 1930
| 
|
|
| 
| Limited Edition O-Card (First print run only)
|-
| 171
| Kameradschaft
| 
| 1931
| 
|
|
| 
|
|-
| 172
| Sherlock Jr.
| , Buster Keaton
| 1924
| 
|
|
| 
| Part of Buster Keaton: 3 Films box set
|-
| 173
| The General
| , Buster Keaton
| 1926
| 
|
|
| 
| Part of Buster Keaton: 3 Films box set
|-
| 174
| Steamboat Bill, Jr.
| , Charles Reisner
| 1928
| 
|
|
| 
| Part of Buster Keaton: 3 Films box set
|-
| 175
| Ich möchte kein Mann sein
| 
| 1918
| 
| 094
|
| 
| Part of Lubitsch in Berlin box set
|-
| 176
| Die Puppe
| 
| 1918
| 
| 095
|
| 
| Part of Lubitsch in Berlin box set
|-
| 177
| Die Austernprinzessin
| 
| 1919
| 
| 096
|
| 
| Part of Lubitsch in Berlin box set
|-
| 178
| Sumurun
| 
| 1920
| 
| 097
|
| 
| Part of Lubitsch in Berlin box set
|-
| 179
| Anna Boleyn
| 
| 1920
| 
| 098
|
| 
| Part of Lubitsch in Berlin box set
|-
| 180
| Die Bergkatze
| 
| 1921
| 
| 099
|
| 
| Part of Lubitsch in Berlin box set
|-
| 181
| Cure
| 
| 1997
| 
|
|
| 
| Limited Edition O-Card (First print run only)
|-
| 182
| The Private Life of Sherlock Holmes
| 
| 1970
| 
|
|
| 
|
|-
| 183
| Michael
| 
| 1924
| 
| 003
|
| 
|
|-
| 184
| House
| 
| 1977
| 
| 093
|
| 
|
|-
| 185
| Legend of the Mountain
| 
| 1979
| 
|
|
| 
| Limited Edition O-Card (First print run only)
|-
| style="background:Grey" | 186
| The Barefoot Contessa
| 
| 1954
| 
|
|
| 
|
|-
| 187
| The Old Dark House
| 
| 1932
| 
|
|
| 
| Limited Edition O-Card (first print run only) featuring artwork by Graham Humphreys
|-
| 188
| Cute Girl
| 
| 1980
| 
|
|
| 
| Part of Early Hou Hsiao-Hsien: Three Films 1980–1983 box set

Limited Edition O-card (first print of 2000 copies only)
|-
| 189
| The Green, Green Grass of Home
| 
| 1982
| 
|
|
| 
| Part of Early Hou Hsiao-Hsien: Three Films 1980–1983 box set

Limited Edition O-card (first print of 2000 copies only)
|-
| 190
| The Boys from Fengkuei
| 
| 1983
| 
|
|
| 
| Part of Early Hou Hsiao-Hsien: Three Films 1980–1983 box set

Limited Edition O-card (first print of 2000 copies only)
|-
| style="background:Grey" | 191
| No Way Out
| 
| 1950
| 
|
|
| 
|
|-
| 192
| King of Hearts
| 
| 1966
| 
|
|
| 
| Limited Edition O-Card (First print run only)
|-
| style="background:Grey" | 193
| Birdman of Alcatraz
| 
| 1962
| 
|
|
| 
|
|-
| 194
| Witness for the Prosecution
| align="left" | 
| 1957
| 
|
|
| 
|
|-
| style="background:Grey" |  195
| Salvador
| 
| 1986
| 
|
|
| 
|
|-
| style="background:Grey" | 196
| Laura
| 
| 1944
| 
|
|
| 
|
|-
| 197
| Human Desire
| 
| 1954
| 
|
|
| 
|
|-
| 198
| Irma la Douce
| 
| 1963
| 
|
|
| 
|
|-
| 199
| One, Two, Three
| 
| 1961
| 
|
|
| 
| Limited Edition O-Card (First print run only)
|-
| 200
| The Last Waltz
| 
| 1978
| 
|
|
| 
| Limited Edition Hardbound Case and a 100-page book
|-
| 201
| Hush...Hush, Sweet Charlotte
| 
| 1964
| 
|
|
| 
|
|-
| 202
| Shoah: Four Sisters
| 
| 2018
| 
| 140
|
| 
|
|-
| 203
| The White Reindeer
| 
| 1952
| 
|
|
| 
|Limited Edition O-Card (First print run only)
|-
| 204
| The Woman in the Window
| 
| 1944
| 
|
|
| 
|
|-
| 205
| Cloak and Dagger
| 
| 1946
| 
|
|
| 
|
|-
| 206
| A Tree Grows in Brooklyn
| 
| 1945
| 
|
|
| 
|
|-
| 207
| Rio Grande
| 
| 1950
| 
|
|
| 
| Limited Edition O-Card (First print run only)
|-
| 208
| High Noon
| 
| 1952
| 
|
|
| 
| Limited Edition Hardbound Slipcase and 100-page book
Non-limited edition released 2 March 2020
|-
| 209
| Come Back to the Five and Dime, Jimmy Dean, Jimmy Dean
| 
| 1982
| 
|
|
| 
|
|-
| 210
| The Holy Mountain
| 
| 1926
| 
|002
|
| 
|
|-
| style="background:Grey" |  211
| Coming Home
| 
| 1978
| 
|
|
| 
|
|-
| 212
| The Chant of Jimmie Blacksmith
| 
| 1978
| 
|
|
| 
|
|-
| 213
| The Golem: How He Came into the World
| 
| 1920
| 
|
|
| 
| Limited Edition O-card (first print of 2000 copies only)
|-
| 214
| The Fate of Lee Khan
| 
| 1973
| 
|
|
| 
| Limited Edition O-card (first print of 2000 copies only)
|-
| 215
| Raining in the Mountain
| 
| 1979
| 
|
|
| 
| Limited Edition O-card (first print of 2000 copies only)
|-
| style="background:Grey" | 216
| Hell and High Water
| 
| 1951
| 
|
|
| 
| Part of Fuller at Fox: Five Films box set

Re-released individually on December 7, 2020 (1000 copies only)
|-
| style="background:Grey" | 217
| House of Bamboo
| 
| 1951
| 
|
|
| 
| Part of Fuller at Fox: Five Films box set

Re-released individually on December 7, 2020 (1000 copies only)
|-
| 218
| The African Queen
| 
| 1951
| 
|
|
| 
| Limited Edition Hardbound Case and a 60-page book
|-
| 219
| A Fistful of Dynamite
| 
| 1971
| 
|
|
| 
| Limited Edition Hardbound Case and a 60-page book
Non-limited edition released 11 May 2020
|-
| 220
| The Son of the Sheik
| 
| 1926
| 
|
|
| 
|
|-
| 221
| The Navigator
| 
| 1924
| 
|
|
| 
| Part of Buster Keaton: Three Films 1924–1926 box set

Limited Edition Hardbound Slipcase and 60-page book (first print of 3000 copies only)
|-
| 222
| Seven Chances
| 
| 1925
| 
|
|
| 
| Part of Buster Keaton: Three Films 1924–1926 box set

Limited Edition Hardbound Slipcase and 60-page book (first print of 3000 copies only)
|-
| 223
| Battling Butler
| 
| 1926
| 
|
|
| 
| Part of Buster Keaton: Three Films 1924–1926 box set

Limited Edition Hardbound Slipcase and 60-page book (first print of 3000 copies only)
|-
| 224
| Our Hospitality
| 
| 1923
| 24 August 2020
|
|
| 
| Part of Buster Keaton: Three Films 1923–1926 box set

Limited Edition Hardbound Slipcase and 60-page book (first print of 3000 copies only)
|-
| 225
| Go West
| 
| 1925
| 24 August 2020
|
|
| 
| Part of Buster Keaton: Three Films 1923–1926 box set

Limited Edition Hardbound Slipcase and 60-page book (first print of 3000 copies only)
|-
| 226
| College
| 
| 1926
| 24 August 2020
|
|
| 
| Part of Buster Keaton: Three Films 1923–1926 box set

Limited Edition Hardbound Slipcase and 60-page book (first print of 3000 copies only)
|-
| 227
| Long Day's Journey into Night
| 
| 1962
| 
|
|
| 
|
|-
| 228
| Kwaidan
| 
| 1965
| 
| 029
|
| 
| Limited Edition Hardbound Case and a 100-page book
|-
| 229
| The Thousand Eyes of Dr. Mabuse
| 
| 1960
| 
| 091
|
| 
| Limited Edition O-Card (First print run only)
|-
| 230
| Throw Down
| 
| 2004
| 
|
|
| 
| Limited Edition O-Card (First print run only)
|-
| 231
| Criss Cross
| 
| 1949
| 
|
|
| 
|
|-
| 232
| A Foreign Affair
| 
| 1948
| 
|
|
| 
|
|-
| 233
| Murders in the Rue Morgue
| 
| 1932
| 
|
|
| 
| Part of Three Edgar Allan Poe Adaptations Starring Bela Lugosi box set
|-
| 234
| The Black Cat
| 
| 1934
| 
|
|
| 
| Part of Three Edgar Allan Poe Adaptations Starring Bela Lugosi box set
|-
| 235
| The Raven
| 
| 1935
| 
|
|
| 
| Part of Three Edgar Allan Poe Adaptations Starring Bela Lugosi box set
|-
| 236
| The Man Who Laughs
| 
| 1928
| 
|
|
| 
| Limited Edition O-Card (First print run only)
|-
| 237
| Five Graves to Cairo
| 
| 1943
| 
|
|
| 
|
|-
| 238
| Made in Hong Kong
| 
| 1997
| 
|
|
| 
|
|-
| 239
| Waxworks
| 
| 1924
| 
|
|
| 
| Limited Edition O-Card slipcase (First Print Run of 2000 copies only)
|-
| 240
| Mothra
| 
| 1961
| 
|
|
| 
|
|-
| 241
| The H-Man
| 
| 1958
| 
|
|
| 
| Part of Ishirō Honda Double Feature: The H-Man + Battle in Outer Space box set
|-
| 242
| Battle in Outer Space
| 
| 1959
| 
|
|
| 
| Part of Ishirō Honda Double Feature: The H-Man + Battle in Outer Space box set
|-
| 243
| The Last Warning
| 
| 1928
| 
|
|
| 
| Limited Edition O-card Slipcase (First Print Run of 2000 Copies Only)
|-
| 244
| Viy
| , Georgi Kropachyov
| 1967
| 
|
|
| 
| Limited Edition O-card Slipcase (First Print Run of 3000 Copies Only)
|-
| 245
| Straight Shooting
| 
| 1917
| 
|
|
| 
| Part of "Two Films By John Ford" box set
|-
| 246
| Hell Bent
| 
| 1918
| 
|
|
| 
| Part of "Two Films By John Ford" box set
|-
| 247
| The Spy Who Came In from the Cold
| 
| 1965
| 
|
|
| 
| Limited Edition O-card Slipcase
|-
| 248
| PTU
| 
| 2003
| 
|
|
| 
| Limited Edition O-card Slipcase
|-
| 249
| The Hands of Orlac
| 
| 1924
| 
|
|
| 
| Limited Edition O-card Slipcase
|-
| 250
| Skinner's Dress Suit
| 
| 1926
| 
|
|
| 
| Part of Early Universal Vol.1 box set

Limited Edition O-card Slipcase (First Print Run of 2000 copies only)
|-
| 251
| The Shield of Honor
| 
| 1927
| 
|
|
| 
| Part of Early Universal Vol.1 box set

Limited Edition O-card Slipcase (First Print Run of 2000 copies only)
|-
| 252
| The Shakedown
| 
| 1929
| 
|
|
| 
| Part of Early Universal Vol.1 box set

Limited Edition O-card Slipcase (First Print Run of 2000 copies only)
|-
| 253
| 20,000 Leagues Under the Sea
| 
| 1916
| 
|
|
| 
| Part of Early Universal Vol.2 box set

Limited Edition O-card Slipcase (First Print Run of 2000 copies only)
|-
| 254
| The Calgary Stampede
| 
| 1925
| 
|
|
| 
| Part of Early Universal Vol.2 box set

Limited Edition O-card Slipcase (First Print Run of 2000 copies only)
|-
| 255
| What Happened to Jones?
| 
| 1929
| 
|
|
| 
| Part of Early Universal Vol.2 box set

Limited Edition O-card Slipcase (First Print Run of 2000 copies only)

|-
| 256
| Johnny Guitar
| 
| 1954
| 
|
|
| 
| Limited Edition Box Set (3000 copies)
|-
| 257
| The Great Silence
| 
| 1968
| 
|
|
| 
| Limited Edition O-card Slipcase (First Print Run of 3000 copies only)
|-
| 258
| Champion
| 
| 1949
| 
|
|
| 
|
|-
| 259
| The Love of Jeanne Ney
| 
| 1927
| 
|
|
| 
|
|-
| 260
| The Sun Shines Bright
| 
| 1953
| 
|
|
| 
|
|-
| 261
| The Indian Tomb
| 
| 1921
| 
|
|
| 
|
|-
| 262
| Vampyr
| 
| 1932
| 
| 025
|
| 
| Limited Edition Box Set (3000 copies)
|-
| 263
| Outside the Law
| 
| 1920
| 
|
|
| 
|
|-
| 264
| Execution in Autumn
| 
| 1972
| 
|
|
| 
| Limited Edition O-card Slipcase (First Print Run of 2000 copies only)
|-
| 265
| Running Out of Time
| 
| 1999
| 
|
|
| 
| Part of Running Out of Time 1 & 2 box set

Limited Edition O-card Slipcase (First Print Run of 2000 copies only)

|-
| 266
| Running Out of Time 2
| , Law Wing-cheung
| 2001
| 
|
|
| 
| Part of Running Out of Time 1 & 2 box set

Limited Edition O-card Slipcase (First Print Run of 2000 copies only)

|-
| 267
| Man Without a Star
| 
| 1955
| 
|
|
| 
| 
|-
| 268
| The Saphead
| , Winchell Smith
| 1920
| 
|
|
| 
|Limited Edition O-card Slipcase (First Print Run of 2000 copies only)

|-
| 269
| The Most Dangerous Game
| , Ernest B. Schoedsack
| 1932
| 
|
|
| 
|Limited Edition O-card Slipcase (First Print Run of 2000 copies only)

|-
| 270
| The Hunchback of Notre Dame
| 
| 1923
| 
|
|
| 
|Limited Edition O-card Slipcase (First Print Run of 2000 copies only)

|-
| 271
| Son of the White Mare
| 
| 1981
| 
|
|
| 
|Limited Edition O-card Slipcase (First Print Run of 2000 copies only)

Also includes Dreams on Wings (1968), Johnny Corncob (1973), Sisyphus (1974) and The Struggle (1977)
|-
| 272
| Run, Man, Run
| 
| 1968
| 
|
|
| 
| Limited Edition O-card Slipcase (First Print Run of 3000 copies only)
|-
| 273
| Violent Streets
| 
| 1974
| 
|
|
| 
| Limited Edition O-card Slipcase (First Print Run of 2000 copies only)
|-
| 274
| The Third Part of the Night
| 
| 1971
| 
|
|
| 
| Part of Andrzej Żuławski: Three Films box set

Limited Edition Box Set (3000 copies)
|-
| 275
| The Devil
| 
| 1972
| 
|
|
| 
| Part of Andrzej Żuławski: Three Films box set

Limited Edition Box Set (3000 copies)
|-
| 276
| On the Silver Globe
| 
| 1988
| 
|
|
| 
| Part of Andrzej Żuławski: Three Films box set

Limited Edition Box Set (3000 copies)
|}

 Reception 
Releases under the line are often voted among the best home video releases, including in the best of the year lists by Sight and Sound. Little White Lies listed six releases from the line in their top twenty releases of 2015, and four in 2016.The Guardian chose their release of Silent Running'' as the best reissue of that year.

References

External links 
 
 Original mastersofcinema.org website archived at the Wayback Machine

Home video lines
Home video companies of the United Kingdom